Gorochana or gorocana (transliterated from  "cattle-light"; also  gi-wang) refers to a stone or 'bezoar' found in cattle ( go), such as the bull, cow, ox, and yak. Its presence in the animal is reputedly indicated by the snoring or other nocturnal sounds made by the animal in its sleep.  Its equivalent in Sinitic culture is calculus bovis. The vernacular Hindi and Bengali names are the same as the Sanskrit.

Vedic legend 
Legend has it that Indra once cast the five precious minerals: gold, silver, coral, pearl, and either sapphire or turquoise, into the great ocean. These were eventually consumed by various animals, which then formed bezoars within their bodies. They have different colors and potencies based on the animal they originate from.

Medicinal properties 
Reputedly, Gorochana acts as an antidote to poisons, promotes clear thoughts, and alleviates fevers and contagious diseases. The superior, mediocre, and inferior forms of these stones are reputed to respectively cure seven, five, or three patients who have been poisoned. In medieval European medical traditions bezoars were highly esteemed as an antidote to poisoning. 'Oriental bezoars' obtained from the East were particularly prized ones.
In India, A drop of Gorochana will be given along with mothers milk every particular day of the baby's birth. It will help to tremendously enhance voice clarity for babies.

Source and other properties 
Gorochana of the finest quality is supposedly obtained from the brain or forehead of an elephant, and the second best quality is obtained from the stomach of a cow. Resembling the yellow yolk of a boiled egg, the yellow pigment obtained from a Gorochana is used as a tonic, sedative or tilaka to the forehead.

References

Tibetan Buddhism